Michael Bell-Smith is an assistant professor of new media at Purchase College, State University of New York. He was an Eyebeam resident in 2002. Examples of his work have been shown at the Hirshhorn Museum and Sculpture Garden in Washington, D.C., at the New Museum of Contemporary Art in New York, and at the San Francisco Museum of Modern Art.

References

External links
Homepage

American contemporary artists
Living people
Year of birth missing (living people)